The 2014 United States Senate election in Kentucky took place on November 4, 2014 to elect a member of the United States Senate to represent the Commonwealth of Kentucky, concurrently with elections to the United States Senate in other states and elections to the United States House of Representatives and various state and local elections.

Incumbent Republican Senator Mitch McConnell, the Senate Minority Leader, ran for re-election to a sixth term. He faced Democratic nominee and Kentucky Secretary of State Alison Lundergan Grimes and Libertarian nominee David Patterson in the general election.

The race was initially seen as a possible pickup opportunity for Democrats, largely due to McConnell's unpopularity among Kentucky voters. By election day, however, both The Cook Political Report and the Rothenberg Political Report considered Republicans to be favored. McConnell ultimately defeated Grimes by a landslide margin of 56.2% to 40.7%.

Republican primary 
Immediately after a secret recording of Mitch McConnell and his campaign staff was released to Mother Jones, McConnell expressed concerns about what he saw as a threat from the left. David Adams, a Kentucky Tea Party activist who was seeking a Republican opponent to McConnell, told The New York Times that McConnell's fears about "threats from the left" were misplaced. Adams said: "It's going to come from the right. The fact that he's coming unglued about this thing should make clear to observers that he may not be ready for the challenge that lies ahead."

McConnell won the primary with 60.2% of the vote. According to analysis by the University of Minnesota, this is the lowest voter support for a Kentucky U.S. Senator in a primary by either party since 1938.

Candidates

Declared 
 Matt Bevin, businessman
 Brad Copas, former National Guardsman
 Mitch McConnell, incumbent U.S. Senator
 Chris Payne, party promoter
 Shawna Sterling, doctoral student

Withdrew 
 Gurley L. Martin, World War II Veteran and candidate for the U.S. Senate in 2010

Declined 
 Andy Barr, U.S. Representative
 Ernie Fletcher, former Governor of Kentucky and former U.S. Representative
 Brett Guthrie, U.S. Representative
 John Kemper, candidate for State Auditor in 2011
 Thomas Massie, U.S. Representative

Endorsements

Polling 

 ^ Internal poll for Mitch McConnell campaign

Results

Democratic primary 
In late 2012 and early 2013, media speculation focused on the possibility of a challenge to incumbent Mitch McConnell from actress and Tennessee resident Ashley Judd, who was raised in Kentucky. Judd later announced that she would not seek the Democratic nomination. On April 9, Mother Jones magazine released a tape of a private meeting between McConnell and, allegedly, his aides reviewing opposition research and tactics to use against Judd. At the February strategy session, McConnell referred to the early stages of his re-election bid as the "Whac-A-Mole period of the campaign" and he and aides discussed attacking Judd's religious views as well as her struggle with depression.

Alison Lundergan Grimes, the sitting Secretary of State, entered the primary race with the encouragement of former President Bill Clinton, a friend of Grimes's father, a former Kentucky politician. On May 20, 2014, she won the Democratic primary with 77% of the vote.  Her father's involvement in the campaign has been noted as a factor in the race because of his personal political history and fundraising connections he brings.

Candidates

Declared 
 Burrel Farnsley, perennial candidate
 Alison Lundergan Grimes, Secretary of State of Kentucky
 Greg Leichty, professor at the University of Louisville
 Tom Recktenwald, businessman

Withdrew 
 Ed Marksberry, contractor and nominee for Kentucky's 2nd congressional district in 2010 (ran as an independent before dropping out entirely)

Declined 
 Jerry Abramson, Lieutenant Governor of Kentucky and former Mayor of Louisville
 Matthew Barzun, United States Ambassador to the United Kingdom and former United States Ambassador to Sweden
 Steve Beshear, Governor of Kentucky
 John Young Brown III, former Secretary of State of Kentucky and candidate for Lieutenant Governor of Kentucky in 2007
 Ben Chandler, former U.S. Representative
 Jack Conway, Attorney General of Kentucky and nominee for the U.S. Senate in 2010
 Adam Edelen, State Auditor of Kentucky
 Greg Fischer, Mayor of Louisville
 Tom FitzGerald, Executive Director of the Kentucky Resources Council
 Heather French Henry, former Miss America
 Bill Garmer, attorney, former Chairman of the Kentucky Democratic Party
 Gill Holland, film producer and environmental activist
 Ashley Judd, actress and political activist
 Crit Luallen, former State Auditor
 Daniel Mongiardo, former Lieutenant Governor of Kentucky and nominee for the U.S. Senate in 2004
 Dennis Parrett, State Senator
 Greg Stumbo, Speaker of the Kentucky House of Representatives and former Attorney General of Kentucky
 John Yarmuth, U.S. Representative

Endorsements

Polling

Results

Libertarian primary

Candidates

Declared 
 David Patterson, police officer

Results 
Patterson won the Libertarian primary on March 1, 2014. While he ran unopposed, all Libertarian Party candidates must defeat None of the above (NOTA) in the primary operated by the Libertarian Party of Kentucky. He became an official ballot-listed candidate on August 11 after submitting over 9,100 signatures.

Independents

Candidates

Declared 
 Mike Maggard (write-in)
 Robert Ransdell (write-in), white supremacist and Neo-Nazi campaigner
 Shawna Sterling (write-in), unsuccessful Republican candidate for the seat

Withdrew 
 Ed Marksberry, contractor and Democratic nominee for Kentucky's 2nd congressional district in 2010

General election

Debates 
 Complete video of debate, October 13, 2014

Predictions

Polling 

 ^ Internal poll for McConnell campaign
 * Internal Poll for Grimes campaign

Results

See also 

 2014 United States Senate elections
 2014 United States elections

References

External links 
 U.S. Senate elections in Kentucky, 2014 at Ballotpedia
 Campaign contributions at OpenSecrets.org

Kentucky
2014
United States Senate